The nothing to hide argument states that individuals have no reason to fear or oppose surveillance programs, unless they are afraid it will uncover their own illicit activities. An individual using this argument may claim that an average person should not worry about government surveillance, as they would have "nothing to hide".

History
An early instance of this argument was referenced by Henry James in his 1888 novel, The Reverberator:

Upton Sinclair also referenced a similar argument in his book The Profits of Religion, published in 1917 :

The motto "If you've got nothing to hide, you've got nothing to fear" has been used in defense of the closed-circuit television program practiced in the United Kingdom.

Prevalence
This argument is commonly used in discussions regarding privacy. Geoffrey Stone, a legal scholar, said that the use of the argument is "all-too-common". Bruce Schneier, a data security expert and cryptographer, described it as the "most common retort against privacy advocates." Colin J. Bennett, author of The Privacy Advocates, said that an advocate of privacy often "has to constantly refute" the argument. Bennett explained that most people "go through their daily lives believing that surveillance processes are not directed at them, but at the miscreants and wrongdoers" and that "the dominant orientation is that mechanisms of surveillance are directed at others" despite "evidence that the monitoring of individual behavior has become routine and everyday".

An ethnographic study by Ana Viseu, Andrew Clement, and Jane Aspinal revealed that individuals with higher socioeconomic status were not as concerned by surveillance as their counterparts. In another study regarding privacy-enhancing technology, Viseu et al., noticed a compliancy regarding user privacy. Both studies attributed this attitude to the nothing to hide argument.

A qualitative study conducted for the government of the United Kingdom around 2003 found that self-employed men initially used the "nothing to hide" argument before shifting to an argument in which they perceived surveillance to be a nuisance instead of a threat.

Viseu et al., said that the argument "has been well documented in the privacy literature as a stumbling block to the development of pragmatic privacy protection strategies, and it, too, is related to the ambiguous and symbolic nature of the term ‘privacy’ itself." They explained that privacy is an abstract concept and people only become concerned with it once their privacy is gone. Furthermore, they compare a loss to privacy with people knowing that ozone depletion and global warming are negative developments, but that "the immediate gains of driving the car to work or putting on hairspray outweigh the often invisible losses of polluting the environment."

Criticism 

Edward Snowden remarked "Arguing that you don't care about the right to privacy because you have nothing to hide is no different than saying you don't care about free speech because you have nothing to say." He considered claiming nothing to hide as giving up the right of privacy which the government has to protect. 

Daniel J. Solove stated in an article for The Chronicle of Higher Education that he opposes the argument. He believed that a government can leak information about a person and cause damage to that person, or use information about a person to deny access to services, even if a person did not actually engage in wrongdoing. A government can cause damage to one's personal life through making errors. Solove wrote "When engaged directly, the nothing-to-hide argument can ensnare, for it forces the debate to focus on its narrow understanding of privacy. But when confronted with the plurality of privacy problems implicated by government data collection and use beyond surveillance and disclosure, the nothing-to-hide argument, in the end, has nothing to say."

Adam D. Moore, author of Privacy Rights: Moral and Legal Foundations, argued, "it is the view that rights are resistant to cost/benefit or consequentialist sort of arguments. Here we are rejecting the view that privacy interests are the sorts of things that can be traded for security." He also stated that surveillance can disproportionately affect certain groups in society based on appearance, ethnicity, sexuality, and religion.

Bruce Schneier, a computer security expert and cryptographer, expressed opposition, citing Cardinal Richelieu's statement, "Give me six lines written by the hand of the most honest man, I'll find enough to hang him," referring to how a state government can find aspects in a person's life in order to prosecute or blackmail that individual. Schneier also argued that the actual choice is between "liberty versus control" instead of "security versus privacy".

Harvey A. Silverglate estimated that the common person, on average, unknowingly commits three felonies a day in the US.

Emilio Mordini, philosopher and psychoanalyst, argued that the "nothing to hide" argument is inherently paradoxical. People do not need to have "something to hide" in order to hide "something".  What is hidden is not necessarily relevant, claims Mordini. Instead, he argues an intimate area which can be both hidden and access-restricted is necessary since, psychologically speaking, we become individuals through the discovery that we could hide something to others.

Julian Assange agreed with Jacob Appelbaum and stated that "Mass surveillance is a mass structural change. When society goes bad, it's going to take you with it, even if you are the blandest person on earth." 

Ignacio Cofone, a law professor, argued that the argument is mistaken in its own terms because, whenever people disclose relevant information to others, they also disclose irrelevant information. This irrelevant information has privacy costs and can lead to other harms, such as discrimination.

In refutation of the argument, the Indian Supreme Court has found that the right to privacy is a fundamental right of Indian citizens.

See also

Notes

References
 Bennett, Colin J. The Privacy Advocates: Resisting the Spread of Surveillance. MIT Press, 2008. , 9780262260428.
 Best, Kirsty. "Living in the control society Surveillance, users and digital screen technologies." International Journal of Cultural Studies. January 2010. Volume 13, No. 1, p. 5-24. doi: 10.1177/1367877909348536. Available at SAGE Journals.
 Cofone, Ignacio N., Nothing to Hide, but Something to Lose, University of Toronto Law Journal 70(1):64-90 (2020).
 Mordini, Emilio. "Nothing to Hide — Biometrics, Privacy and Private Sphere." In: Schouten, Ben, Niels Christian Juul, Andrzej Drygajlo, and Massimo Tistarelli (editors). Biometrics and Identity Management: First European Workshop, BIOID 2008, Roskilde, Denmark, May 7–9, 2008, Revised Selected Papers. Springer Science+Business Media, 2008. p. 245-258. , 9783540899907.
 Moore, Adam D. Privacy Rights: Moral and Legal Foundations. Penn State Press, March 28, 2011. , 9780271036861.
 Privacy Online: OECD Guidance on Policy and Practice. OECD Publishing, November 18, 2003. , 9789264101630.
 Solove, Daniel J. Nothing to Hide: The False Tradeoff Between Privacy and Security. Yale University Press, May 31, 2011. , 9780300172317.
 Viseu, Ana, Andrew Clement and Jane Aspinal. "Situating Privacy Online: Complex Perceptions and Everyday Practices." Information, Communication & Society (ISSN 1369-118X). 2004. 7(1): 92–114. DOI: 10.1080/1369118042000208924. Available from Taylor & Francis Online.

Further reading
 Cofone, Ignacio N., Nothing to Hide, but Something to Lose, University of Toronto Law Journal 70(1):64-90 (2020)
 Klein, Sascha. "I've got nothing to hide": Electronic surveillance of communications, privacy and the power of arguments. GRIN Verlag, Apr 26, 2012. , 9783656179139.
 Solove, Daniel J. "'I've Got Nothing to Hide' and Other Misunderstandings of Privacy." San Diego Law Review, Vol. 44, p. 745, 2007. p. 745. ISSN 0036-4037. Accession Number 31197940. George Washington University Law School Public Law Research Paper No. 289. - An essay that was written for a symposium in the San Diego Law Review. Available at Academic Search Complete, HeinOnline, LexisNexis Academic, and Social Science Research Network.
 "Surveillance and "Nothing to Hide"." (Archive) CSE/ISE 312: Legal, Social, and Ethical Issues. Stony Brook University. - PowerPoint presentation based on Solove's work.
 

Arguments
Criminal justice ethics
Law and morality
Privacy
Surveillance